Jean Tze Chua (born 29 August 1987) is a Malaysian professional golfer. She graduated from Wake Forest University, North Carolina in May 2009 and turned professional in August 2009. She won in her debut as a professional in the Thai LPGA Open in August 2009.

External links

Profile at Wake Forest University
Article in MGA Online
Article in The Star Newspaper
Article in The Star Newspaper

Malaysian female golfers
Sportspeople from Kuala Lumpur
1987 births
Living people